Winning the third place game at Eurobasket 2007 against Greece allowed Lithuania to qualify for the Olympic basketball tournament at Beijing 2008 without competition at 2008 Pre-Olympics Tournament. The Lithuanian men's basketball team came in fourth place after being beaten by Argentina's basketball team, 87-75.

2008 Olympic tournament roster 
Lithuanian basketball team started its preparation for the Olympics at the end of June, 2008. After couple of training camps and preolympic friendly matches the national team was selected.

|}
| valign="top" |
 Head coach

 Assistant coach(es)

Legend
(C) Team captain
Club field describes last pro club before the tournament
|}

Candidates that didn't make for the final team:

Preparation matches

Olympic games 

Group Stage

Quarterfinal

Semifinal

Bronze medal game

References 

Lith
2008
Olympics